Ashfield District Council elections are held every four years. Ashfield District Council is the local authority for the non-metropolitan district of Ashfield in Nottinghamshire, England. Since the last boundary changes in 2015, 35 councillors are elected from 23 wards.

Political control
The first election to the council was held in 1973, initially operating as a shadow authority before coming into its powers on 1 April 1974. Since 1973 political control of the council has been held by the following parties:

Leadership
The leaders of the council since 2007 have been:

Council elections
1973 Ashfield District Council election
1976 Ashfield District Council election (New ward boundaries)
1979 Ashfield District Council election
1983 Ashfield District Council election
1987 Ashfield District Council election
1991 Ashfield District Council election (District boundary changes took place but the number of seats remained the same)
1995 Ashfield District Council election (District boundary changes took place but the number of seats remained the same)
1999 Ashfield District Council election
2003 Ashfield District Council election (New ward boundaries)
2007 Ashfield District Council election
2011 Ashfield District Council election
2015 Ashfield District Council election (New ward boundaries)
2019 Ashfield District Council election

District result maps

By-election results

1999–2003

2003–2007

2007–2011

2011–2015

2015–2019

References

By-election results

External links
Ashfield District Council

 
Ashfield District
Council elections in Nottinghamshire
Ashfield